West Coast Motors (legally incorporated as Craig of Campbeltown Limited) is a bus, coach and ferry operator, based in Campbeltown, Scotland. The company also operates under the name Borders Buses and Glasgow Citybus.

History
The founding of the company dates back to 1921, when Jack Craig commenced a bus operation in Campbeltown. In 1935, William Craig convinced the Royal Mail to allow him to commence an overnight road service from Campbeltown to Glasgow, in lieu of transporting mail by ship. The company remained a Royal Mail contractor until October 2011.

In 1950, the business purchased Dickies of Tarbert, along with the service between East and West Loch Tarbert Piers. In 1955, haulage company West Coast Transport was formed. After purchasing James McPhee Haulage and Ramsays Haulage in 1963, the business was sold to British Road Services in 1966.

In 1970, McConnachie's was purchased, resulting in West Coast operating all services in the Kintyre area. In 1982, McColls of Benderloch was purchased, along with the Oban to Benderloch and Easdale services. In 1986, Stag Garage of Lochgilphead was purchased, along with services to Ford, Kilmartin and Ormsary. In 1999, West Coast Motors purchased Oban & District Buses.

In 2004, West Coast Motors commenced operating in Bute and Cowal, after taking over services from Stagecoach, along with depots in Dunoon and Rothesay. In 2006, service between Oban and Dalavich was purchased from L.F. Stewart & Son, along with Kilberry and Skipness services from D & E Henderson Hiring.

In January 2008, the City Sightseeing franchise in Glasgow was purchased, followed in 2009 by the Kintyre Express ferry operation. Kintyre Express later commenced operating a ferry service from Campbeltown to Ballycastle, in 2011.

In June 2013, Bowman's Tours on the Isle of Mull was purchased, along with 10 vehicles, and was renamed West Coast Tours. In November 2013, the company acquired Fairline Coaches in Glasgow, along with 16 vehicles.

Borders Buses

In February 2016, Perryman's Buses of Berwick-upon-Tweed was purchased by West Coast Motors. The sale included 45 vehicles, and both depots at Berwick-upon-Tweed and St. Boswells. Later in the same year, Perryman's also took over several services from First Scotland East. The remainder of First's operations in the Scottish Borders, including the depot at Galashiels, as well as outstations at Hawick, Kelso and Peebles, was sold to West Coast Motors in March 2017.

In July 2017, the business was re-branded as Borders Buses. Re-branding saw the introduction of a new cream and red corporate livery, with a blue stripe along the length of the vehicle. Some vehicles operating on key routes have since received route-specific branding, based on the corporate livery.

Glasgow Citybus

Glasgow Citybus was purchased by West Coast Motors in 2006. The company operates local bus services in Glasgow and Dunbartonshire, with a fleet of around 60 vehicles.

Scottish Citylink

As well as operating local bus services, West Coast Motors has, since 1986, operated long-distance express services on behalf of Scottish Citylink. West Coast Motors mainly serve the route between Glasgow and Campbeltown, but also operate on other routes, serving Dundee, Edinburgh, Fort William, Oban and the Isle of Skye.

In May 2008, the company refused to sign a new contract to operate Scottish Citylink routes in the Highlands, and launched a series of routes in competition. Two months later, the services were withdrawn, with a new contract drawn up between the two companies. West Coast Motors resumed operation of Scottish Citylink services in September 2008.

As of April 2022, West Coast Motors operates the following services on behalf of Scottish Citylink:
914, 915 & 916: Glasgow to Fort William and Skye
926: Glasgow to Campbeltown
975/976: Glasgow to Oban
978: Edinburgh to Oban

AIR: Glasgow to Edinburgh Airport

Fleet and operations
As at November 2013, West Coast operates a fleet of 191 buses and coaches (excluding the Borders Buses operation).

As of March 2020, West Coast Motors operate bus and coach services from eleven depots.

 Ardrishaig: Glenburn Road, Ardrishaig, Argyll and Bute
 Berwick-upon-Tweed: Ramparts Business Park, North Road, Berwick-upon-Tweed, Northumberland
 Campbeltown: Benmhor, Campbeltown, Argyll and Bute
 Dunoon: Argyll Road, Dunoon, Argyll and Bute
 Galashiels: Duke Street, Galashiels, Scottish Borders
 Glasgow: South Street, Glasgow
 Glasgow: Charles Street, Glasgow
 Mull: Birchwood, Craignure, Isle of Mull, Argyll and Bute
 Oban: Glengallan Road, Oban, Argyll and Bute
Rothesay: High Road, Ardbeg, Rothesay, Argyll and Bute
 St. Boswells: Mitchells Yard, Charlesfield, St. Boswells, Melrose, Scottish Borders

Notes

References

External links
Company website

Bus operators in Scotland
Coach operators in Scotland
Transport companies established in 1923
Companies based in Argyll and Bute
Ferry companies of Northern Ireland
Ferry companies of Scotland
Transport in Argyll and Bute
1923 establishments in Scotland